The Billboard Hot 100 is a chart that ranks the best-performing singles of the United States. Its data, published by Billboard magazine and compiled by Nielsen SoundScan, is based collectively on each single's weekly physical and digital sales, as well as airplay and streaming. At the end of a year, Billboard will publish an annual list of the 100 most successful songs throughout that year on the Hot 100 chart based on the information. For 2005, the list was published on December 20, calculated with data from December 4, 2004, to November 26, 2005. The R&B track "We Belong Together" by American singer Mariah Carey was named the number 1 song of 2005 and it spent the longest time at number 1 for the year, 14 weeks. This is also the third-longest time at number 1 for a single in the 57-year history of the Hot 100 post-1958 inception, after Mariah Carey's own collaboration with Boyz II Men, "One Sweet Day", which spent 16 weeks atop the Hot 100 from 1995 to 1996, and "Despacito" by Luis Fonsi and Daddy Yankee, featuring Justin Bieber, which equaled that mark in 2017, both being beaten in 2019 by "Old Town Road" by Lil Nas X and Billy Ray Cyrus, which had 19 weeks at #1.

List

See also
2005 in music
List of Billboard Hot 100 number-one singles of 2005
List of Billboard Hot 100 top-ten singles in 2005

References

United States Hot 100 Year-end
Billboard charts